The 1983 Benue State gubernatorial election occurred in Nigeria on August 13, 1983. The NPN nominee Aper Aku won the election, defeating other candidates.

Aper Aku emerged NPN candidate.

Electoral system
The Governor of Benue State is elected using the plurality voting system.

Primary election

NPN primary
The NPN primary election was won by Aper Aku.

Results

References 

Benue State gubernatorial elections
Benue State gubernatorial election
Benue State gubernatorial election